Isam Bachiri (Arabic: عصام بشيري - born 1 August 1977) is a Danish vocalist, rapper and songwriter formerly of the hip hop group Outlandish. As of recent years, he is a solo artist.

Early life
Isam Bachiri is a Muslim of Riffian descent born in 1977 in Copenhagen, Denmark.

Bachiri came into contact with music in his youth through the developing hip hop scene and subculture in America.

Career
Between 1997 and 2017 Bachiri joined Waqas Ali Qadri and Lenny Martinez to form the Danish hip-hop group Outlandish, drawing upon the influences of their respective ethnic heritage, and in particular the Islamic faith of two of the band members.

'Ramadan in Copenhagen' in the Højskolesangbogen 
In May 2019, a group of artists met to suggest songs for inclusion in the Danish Højskolesangbogen (high school songbook) in order to better represent the nation's cultural diversity. Isam was one of the artists who participated in this meeting and discussion, and his song 'Ramadan i København' (Ramadan in Copenhagen) was one of the songs proposed for inclusion.

This led to some controversy, with the Danish People's Party using a social media post to object to the song's inclusion. Isam has since defended its inclusion, and notes the "great honour" of being included in the book, despite criticisms he has received as a result.

Album
 
Institution (2007) CD, Album) Genlyd 2000, Sony BMG Music Entertainment
Music Producer: Birk Nevel, Gustaf Ljunggren, Isam B, Jesper Haugaard, Morten Buchholtz, Søren Mikkelsen
2200 Carmen (CD, Album) (2009) Sony Music Entertainment
Music Producer: Isam B med band
Lost For Words (2018) Warner Music Group
Music Producer: Ole Brodersen Meyer

Singles&Ep 
Karen Isam B& Guld & Platin Sony Music Entertainment
Music Producer:Isam B& Guld & Platin
Mad World (2010) Michael Parsberg Feat. Safri Duo & Isam B Disco wax,MP1
Music Producer: Michael Parsberg Feat. Safri Duo & Isam B
Undone (Change Will Come) (2014) Sony Music Entertainment
Music Producer: Kay&Ndustry
Faking A Smile (2015) Sony Music Entertainment
Music Producer: Kay&Ndustry
Smile And Pretend (2017) Warner Music Group
Music Producer: Andreas "Maskinen" Sommer
Life (2018) Warner Music Group
Music Producer: Mattis Jakobsen
Peace Hymn (2018) Warner Music Group
Music Producer: Isam Bachiri, Morten Sewell Woods
Man With A Plan (2018) Warner Music Group
Music Producer: Isam Bachiri 
 Fortæl Fortæl (2022) Sony Music Entertainment
Music Composer, Producer: Kadir Demir, Kasper Falkenberg

Book
Fædreland Fatherland

References

External links

Berber musicians
Living people
1977 births
Danish people of Moroccan-Berber descent
Danish rappers
Danish Muslims
People from Copenhagen Municipality